The 1933 Montana State Bobcats football team was an American football team that represented Montana State College (later renamed Montana State University) in the Rocky Mountain Conference (RMC) during the 1933 college football season. In their sixth season under head coach Schubert R. Dyche, the Bobcats compiled a 2–5 record (1–3 against RMC opponents), finished in ninth place out of 12 teams in the RMC, and were outscored by a total of 171 to 38.

Schedule

References

Montana State
Montana State Bobcats football seasons
Montana State Bobcats football